Jenna Loder (born July 11, 1988) is a Canadian curler from Winnipeg, Manitoba. She is a two-time Canadian junior champion and two-time world junior medallist (2008, 2009), playing third for Kaitlyn Lawes.

Career
Loder, along with skip Kaitlyn Lawes, second Liz Peters, and lead Sarah Wazney, represented Manitoba at the 2008 Canadian Junior Curling Championships, where they won, beating Stephanie McVicar's Saskatchewan rink in the final to qualify for the 2008 World Junior Curling Championships. There, the team lost the 3 vs. 4 playoff game against Russia's Liudmila Privivkova; they faced the Russians again in the bronze medal match, which they won.

Loder, along with Lawes and a new front end of Laryssa Grenkow and Breanne Meakin, returned to the 2009 Canadian Junior Curling Championships, making playoffs and defeating Rachel Homan's team from Ontario in the final. At the 2009 World Junior Curling Championships, the team lost the final to Eve Muirhead's team from Great Britain and claimed the silver medal. On the World Curling Tour that season, the team made it to the semifinals of a Grand Slam, the 2008 Casinos of Winnipeg Classic.

Loder skipped her own team of Liz Peters, Sarah Wazney, and Mary Jane McKenzie for the 2009–10 curling season. They competed in one Grand Slam, the 2009 Manitoba Lotteries Women's Curling Classic.

For the 2010–11 curling season, Loder played second for Jill Thurston. The team qualified for the 2011 Manitoba Scotties Tournament of Hearts, but failed to make playoffs.

The following season, Loder joined Cathy Overton-Clapham's team at third. The team won the 2011 Curlers Corner Autumn Gold Curling Classic, participated in the 2012 Manitoba Scotties Tournament of Hearts, and were finalists in the 2012 Players' Championship. The team remained intact for the 2012–13 curling season, but missed playoffs at all four Grand Slams that they played in and the 2013 Manitoba Scotties Tournament of Hearts, and they placed last in the round robin of the 2012 Canada Cup of Curling, winning a single match. That season, Loder also competed in the 2013 Canadian Mixed Doubles Curling Trials with teammate Josh Heidt. They started with two wins but narrowly missed playoffs.

Loder was the second for Barb Spencer during the 2013–14 curling season. The team won one event that season, the DEKALB Superspiel. They competed in the 2013 Canadian Olympic Curling Pre-Trials, but were eliminated from playoff contention following a loss to Cheryl Bernard. They placed third in the 2014 Manitoba Scotties Tournament of Hearts after losing in the semifinal to the eventual winner, Chelsea Carey. Loder and Heidt competed again in the 2014 Canadian Mixed Doubles Curling Trials, but missed playoffs again.

For the 2014–15 curling season, Loder joined Trish Paulsen's Saskatchewan team at second. The team competed in the 2015 Saskatchewan Scotties Tournament of Hearts but failed to reach playoffs.

Loder joined Kelly Scott's British Columbia rink at second for the 2015–16 curling season. The team, with third Shannon Joanisse and lead Sarah Pyke, were finalists in the 2016 British Columbia Scotties Tournament of Hearts, losing to Karla Thompson.

Loder returned to playing third during the 2016–17 curling season, when she returned to Manitoba to play for Cathy Overton-Clapham, with a front end of Katherine Doerksen and Sarah Pyke. The team missed playoffs at the 2017 Manitoba Scotties Tournament of Hearts.

Loder and Doerksen joined the Beth Peterson team for the 2018–19 season. The team had three semifinal finishes on the tour and won the Manitoba Scotties Berth Bonspiel to qualify for the 2019 Manitoba Scotties Tournament of Hearts. Team Peterson would have a very successful provincial championship in their first season as a team, finishing 5–2 through the round robin and qualifying for a tiebreaker against Abby Ackland. Despite tying the game in the seventh end, Team Peterson would give up three points in the eighth end, ultimately losing the game 8–7. The 2019–20 season was a successful season for the Peterson rink as they qualified for the playoffs in eight of their ten events. They also got to play in the 2019 Tour Challenge Tier 2 where they lost in the semifinal to South Korea's Kim Min-ji. Despite entering the 2020 Manitoba Scotties Tournament of Hearts as the fourth seed, Team Peterson finished the round robin with a 2–3 record, failing to reach the championship pool round.

Due to the COVID-19 pandemic in Canada, many provinces had to cancel their provincial championships, with member associations selecting their representatives for the 2021 Scotties Tournament of Hearts. Due to this situation, Curling Canada added three Wild Card teams to the national championship, which were determined by the CTRS standings from the 2019–20 season. Because Team Peterson ranked 12th on the CTRS and kept at least three of their four players together for the 2020–21 season, they got the third Wild Card spot at the 2021 Scotties in Calgary, Alberta. One member of Team Peterson, Melissa Gordon opted to not attend the Scotties due to work commitments. She was replaced by Brittany Tran, who competed at the Scotties in 2019 as second for the Northwest Territories. At the Tournament of Hearts, they finished with a respectable 7–5 fifth-place finish.

Personal life
Loder currently works as a technical advisor for the Federal Government. She is in a relationship with Anthony Tummillo.

Teams

References

External links

Living people
Curlers from Saskatchewan
Curlers from British Columbia
Curlers from Winnipeg
1988 births
Canadian women curlers
Canada Cup (curling) participants